Margaret Charles Smith (September 12, 1906–November 12, 2004) was an African-American midwife, who became known for her extraordinary skill over a long career, spanning over thirty years. Despite working primarily in rural areas with women who were often in poor health, she lost very few of the more than 3000 babies she delivered, and none of the mothers in childbirth. In 1949, she became one of the first official midwives in Green County, Alabama, and she was still practicing in 1976, when the state passed a law outlawing traditional midwifery. In the 1990s, she cowrote a book about her career, Listen to Me Good: The Life Story of an Alabama Midwife, and in 2010 she was inducted into the Alabama Women's Hall of Fame.

Early life
Margaret Charles Smith was Born in Eutaw, Alabama on September 12, 1906. About 3 weeks after Smith’s birth however, her mother Beulah Sanders, passed away. After the death of her mother, Smith was raised by her grandparents on their farm in Eutaw, Alabama.  Her grandparents were local farmers, and her grandmother, Margaret Charles, was a former slave and midwife. She attended a rural grammar school in her hometown of Eutaw, Alabama, but the demands of farming sometimes interrupted her schooling, and she left school entirely at age 16 when her grandfather died.

Midwife career
Margaret Charles Smith, also known as "Miss Margaret" was first introduced to midwifery around the young age of five year old. Smith had her first midwifery experience while assisting at the bedside during the birth of an infant of her future husband-to-be's cousin's wife. Smith caught the infant as the birth was taking place and before the midwife was able to make their arrival to the home. Smith became interested in midwifery in her teens but didn't begin training until her late thirties, with a local midwife named Ella Anderson. In 1949, Greene County issued a permit for Smith to practice midwifery, making her one of the county's first official midwives. In that era, "granny midwives" (as lay African-American midwives like Smith were informally called) were crucial to the lives of Southern black women because most hospitals would not admit them as patients. Smith worked in three local clinics alongside medical doctors for twenty-eight years assisting in the transition to modern medicine and medical routines. During her 35-year career, Smith delivered over 3000 babies to mothers who were often malnourished and in poor health. Despite this, she lost almost none of the babies and none of the mothers in childbirth. Margaret Charles Smith was able to successfully deliver twins, babies who were in the breeched position, and even premature babies. Sometimes the mothers that Smith would provide midwifery services for could not afford to pay Smith anything for her services. Other times the mothers that Smith would midwife for would pay in produce. At times, Smith was getting paid up to five to ten dollars per birth attended.

During the period in which she practiced (ca. 1945–ca. 1980), infant mortality among African-American women ranged from around 74 to around 22 per thousand babies born, levels that underline how remarkable her own record was.

In 1976, Alabama outlawed traditional midwifery, but Smith was allowed to continue on for a while due to her experience. She received her last permit to practice midwifery in 1981. (The state later passed laws allowing nurse-midwives to practice in hospitals).

In 1996, Smith cowrote a book about her life, Listen to Me Good: The Life Story of an Alabama Midwife. Her coauthor, Linda Janet Holmes, is a research scientist and board member of the National Black Women's Health Project. One reviewer wrote of this book that it transcended the genre of midwife memoirs by examining "the larger context of class and race relations in a state that was at the epicenter of the Civil Rights struggle." Published by Ohio State University Press, it won the press's Helen Hooven Santmyer Prize.

Personal life 
During Smith's school-aged years, she met a man by the name of Randolph Smith in a one roomed segregated schoolhouse in Eutaw Alabama and ended up falling in love. Against the wishes of her grandmother, Margaret Smith, the couple married in 1943. The couple resided on Smith’s grandmother's farm where Randolph Smith ended up taking on hog farming, which led to being the main source of income for the Smith family.

Smith gave birth to three sons, Spencer Charles, Huston Charles, and Herman Smith, her first son was born while she was still in her teens. She served as her own midwife for her second birth, her others accompanied by midwives. She also served as the midwife for the first born daughter of her son Spencer and his wife Betty. The tradition continued with her being present at the birth of her granddaughter's first child.

Later life and death 
Margaret Charles Smith and her family continued to farm at their estate in Eutaw Alabama throughout Smith’s life until just before her death. Despite health issues (including hypertension and peripheral vascular disease), Smith lived to be 98 years old, dying in 2004.

Honors and legacy
In 1983, Smith was given the keys to Eutaw, the first black American to receive this honor.

In 1985, she was honored by the National Black Women’s Health Project.

In 1997, Smith was the keynote speaker at the New Orleans Rural Health Initiative.

In 2003, she was honored by the Congressional Black Caucus in Washington, D.C.

In 2004, she was given a lifetime achievement award at the Black Midwife and Healer’s Conference.

In 2008, a documentary film about Smith's life was released. Entitled Miss Margaret, it was directed by Diana Paul.

In 2010, Smith was inducted into the Alabama Women's Hall of Fame.

References

Further reading
Smith, Margaret Charles, and Linda Janet Holmes. Listen to Me Good: The Life Story of an Alabama Midwife. Women and Health Series. Columbus: Ohio State University Press, 1996.

External links
Miss Margaret preview on YouTube

1906 births
2004 deaths
American midwives
African-American people
People from Eutaw, Alabama
20th-century African-American women
20th-century African-American people
21st-century American women